Eulophonotus is a genus of moths in the family Cossidae endemic to sub-Saharan Africa.

Species
 Eulophonotus armstrongi (Hampson, 1914)
 Eulophonotus congoensis (Strand)
 Eulophonotus elegans (Aurivillius, 1910)
 Eulophonotus hyalinipennis (Strand, 1910)
 Eulophonotus myrmeleon Felder, 1874
 Eulophonotus nigrodiscalis Yakovlev, 2011
 Eulophonotus obesus (Karsch, 1900)
 Eulophonotus stephania (Druce, 1887)

References

 , 2013: The Cossidae (Lepidoptera) of Malawi with descriptions of two new species. Zootaxa, 3709 (4): 371-393. Abstract:

External links
Natural History Museum Lepidoptera generic names catalog

Zeuzerinae
Cossidae genera